Lac de Gnioure is a lake in Ariège, France. At an elevation of 1831.5 m, its surface area is 0.86 km2. Construction of the dam began in 1939 and was completed in 1950. The lake is 2.6 miles from the Andorran border. 

Lakes of Ariège (department)